The Women's Collegiate Lacrosse Associates (WCLA) is a national organization of over 200 non-NCAA, women's college lacrosse programs organized and run by US Lacrosse, the national governing body.  The mission of the WCLA is to promote the growth of women’s lacrosse nationwide. Specifically, WCLA strives to provide an infrastructure in which collegiate clubs will compete and eventually crown a National Champion. Until January 2011, the WCLA was known as US Lacrosse Women's Division Intercollegiate Associates (WDIA).

WCLA National Championship History

Division I

Division II

WCLA leagues
There are nine regional leagues that make up the WCLA. Seven have both Division I and Division II teams:
 Mid Atlantic Women's Lacrosse League 
 New England Women's Lacrosse League 
 Northwest Women's Lacrosse League 
 Rocky Mountain Women's Lacrosse League  
 Women's Lacrosse League 
 Women's Collegiate Lacrosse League 
 Western Women's Lacrosse League

Two leagues offer only one division:
 Southeastern Women's Lacrosse League - Division I only
 National Central Women's Lacrosse League - Division II only

See also
 Men's Collegiate Lacrosse Association
 US Lacrosse
 US Lacrosse Intercollegiate Associates

External links
 Women's Collegiate Lacrosse Associates website
 US Lacrosse - WCLA
 WCLA Championship information

References

College women's lacrosse in the United States
Lacrosse governing bodies of the United States
College club sports associations in the United States